Croton-Harmon Union Free School District (CHUFSD) or Croton-Harmon Schools is a school district headquartered in Croton-on-Hudson, New York. It operates Carrie E. Tompkins Elementary School, Pierre Van Courtlandt Middle School, and Croton-Harmon High School.

Portions of the town of Cortlandt and the town of Yorktown are in the district boundaries.

Edward Fuhrman was previously superintendent until 2018, when he was replaced by Deborah O'Connell.

References

External links
 Croton-Harmon Union Free School District

School districts in New York (state)
Education in Westchester County, New York